Lee Michael Bradbury (born 3 July 1975) is an English football manager and former footballer who is currently manager of National League club Eastleigh.

As a player, he was a striker who made more than 500 appearances in the Football League with notable spells at Portsmouth, Manchester City, Crystal Palace and AFC Bournemouth. He also had spells with Exeter City, Sheffield Wednesday, Birmingham City, Derby County, Walsall, Oxford United and Southend United.

After retiring as a player, he spent 14 months as manager of AFC Bournemouth. After a seven-year spell as manager of National League club Havant & Waterlooville, he took charge of National League South side Eastbourne Borough in May 2019, but left in October 2019 and became assistant head coach at EFL League Two club Crawley Town.

Playing career
When he was an army recruit, Bradbury played part-time when on leave for Halstead Town under 18 side,  and during the 1994–95 season Cowes Sports. Prior to this Bradbury had been a young player at local island side Plessey Sports FC, also based in his hometown of Cowes, Isle of Wight, playing alongside his father Michael. Bradbury also played for Northern Irish side  Fivemiletown United while stationed in Northern Ireland with the army. Bradbury started his professional career at Portsmouth, where he played for three years. A number of impressive performances in the 1996–97 season resulted in interest from a number of clubs, and in July 1997 he was purchased by Manchester City manager Frank Clark for a club record £3 million. However, Bradbury struggled to make an impact at Maine Road, and at the end of the 1997–98 season City were relegated, with Bradbury having scored just six goals.

Three months into the following season Bradbury moved to Crystal Palace for £1.5 million. Less than a year later Bradbury was on the move again, returning to Portsmouth for £300,000.

Bradbury's career started to recover at Pompey, making more than 100 appearances in his second spell at the club. However, in the 2002–03 season Bradbury lost his first team place and was loaned out to Sheffield Wednesday. He returned from his loan spell to contribute three appearances and one goal (ironically against Sheffield Wednesday) to Portsmouth's title run-in as they won the First Division title and promotion to the Premier League. The following season he was loaned to Derby County before being sold to Walsall in March 2004 (where he scored once against former club Derby).

At the end of the 2004–05 season Bradbury was playing for Oxford United. Bradbury signed a four-month contract with Southend United on 31 January 2006. He subsequently signed a longer contract.

In August 2007, Bradbury signed for AFC Bournemouth on a four-month loan deal. After playing one game for the club the loan was made permanent, and Bradbury signed a contract until the end of the season.

In the later stages of Bradbury's career, he played in a much different role, being converted into a right back for Bournemouth during an injury crisis he became the first choice right back for the south coast club, but with the arrival of defender Stephen Purches, who returned after three seasons away from Bournemouth, Bradbury went back to his former role of striker whilst attacking options were limited.

Management career

AFC Bournemouth
On 15 January 2011, Bradbury was appointed as caretaker manager after the departure of Eddie Howe to Burnley. The next day, he announced his retirement from playing, and on 28 January, was given a two-and-a-half-year deal as permanent manager of the club. In January 2012, Bradbury signed an improved three-and-a-half-year contract to manage the League One club, keeping him at Bournemouth until the summer of 2015. During his first season at the helm, Bradbury steered the Cherries into the League One Play-offs, eventually losing to Huddersfield on penalties. On 25 March, during his second season, Bradbury was dismissed from Bournemouth following the club's run of poor form.

Havant & Waterlooville
Bradbury was appointed manager of Conference South club Havant & Waterlooville on 9 October 2012. At the time, Bradbury was coaching the Under-14s at Portsmouth's Academy set up In his first game as manager, his side won 2–1 against Basingstoke Town on 13 October 2012. Following Michael Appleton's departure to become manager at Blackpool, Bradbury was linked with a return to Portsmouth, however Guy Whittingham was appointed instead. On 30 April 2016, Havant & Waterlooville's relegation from the National League South was confirmed.
A whole season in The Isthmian league followed (Havant and Waterlooville being favourites to get promoted), and promotion was achieved on the last day of the season on 22 April 2017. Bradbury earned the  'Manager of the year' award for winning the league. Hawks played the 2017–18 season back in the National League South and won it at the first attempt, gaining promotion to the National League Premier Division.

Eastbourne Borough and Crawley Town
Bradbury moved to Eastbourne Borough in May 2019, and managed the National League South club until October of that year. In December 2019 he was appointed assistant head coach of Crawley Town in League Two, alongside newly appointed head coach John Yems.

Eastleigh
On 28 February 2022, Bradbury was appointed manager of National League club Eastleigh.

Personal life
Lee Bradbury spent time in the army before entering the world of football. His son Harvey is also a footballer.

Managerial statistics

References

External links

AFC Bournemouth profile
Oxford United FC profile

1975 births
Living people
People from Cowes
Association football forwards
English footballers
Fivemiletown United F.C. players
Portsmouth F.C. players
Exeter City F.C. players
Manchester City F.C. players
Crystal Palace F.C. players
Birmingham City F.C. players
Sheffield Wednesday F.C. players
Derby County F.C. players
Walsall F.C. players
Oxford United F.C. players
Southend United F.C. players
AFC Bournemouth players
English Football League players
English football managers
AFC Bournemouth managers
Havant & Waterlooville F.C. managers
Eastbourne Borough F.C. managers
English Football League managers
National League (English football) managers
Crawley Town F.C. non-playing staff
Eastleigh F.C. players